The 1804 United States presidential election in Pennsylvania took place as part of the 1804 United States presidential election. Voters chose 20 representatives, or electors to the Electoral College, who voted for President and Vice President.

Pennsylvania voted for the Democratic-Republican candidate, Thomas Jefferson, over the Federalist candidate, Charles Cotesworth Pinckney. Jefferson won Pennsylvania by a wide margin of 89.38%.

Results

County results

See also
 List of United States presidential elections in Pennsylvania

References

Pennsylvania
1804
1804 Pennsylvania elections